Flávio Donizete da Costa (born 16 January 1984 in Brazil) is a Brazilian retired footballer.

Career
In 2005, Donizete won the 2005 Club World Cup with São Paulo. However, he eventually sold his winners' medal to get money after becoming addicted to cocaine in 2010. As a result of his addiction, he was unable to continue his football career for years and spent months in rehabilitation.

References

External links
 Flávio Donizete at playmakerstats.com (English version of ogol.com.br)

Brazilian footballers
Living people
1984 births
Association football defenders
São Paulo FC players